Adolf Heinrich Wilhelm Scholz, since 1883 Adolf Heinrich Wilhelm von Scholz (born 1 November 1833 in Schweidnitz, died 20 March 1924 at Schloss Seeheim, Constance) was a German army officer and politician. From 1864–1871 he was colonel of the 49th Regiment of Cavalry and retired after the Franco-Prussian War to a more peaceful role in politics. He served as Secretary for the Treasury of Germany from 1880 to 1882. In July 1882 he became Minister of Finance of the Kingdom of Prussia and served in this office until 1890.

He bought the Schloss Seeheim at Constance from Ernst Lang in 1885. His son was the author Wilhelm von Scholz.

Publications 

 Erlebnisse und Gespräche mit Bismarck, Stuttgart und Berlin 1922, J. G. Cotta′sche Buchhandlung Nachfolger, 150 S., 1 Abb.

Literature

External links 

 

Finance ministers of Germany
1833 births
1924 deaths
People from Świdnica
People from the Province of Silesia
Finance ministers of Prussia